The 2021–22 season was the 27th season of competitive association football in Slovakia after Czechoslovakia was divided into two new states.

Slovakia national football team

Kits

2022 FIFA World Cup qualification

2022 FIFA World Cup qualification Group H

2022 FIFA World Cup qualification fixtures and results

2022–23 UEFA Nations League

2022–23 UEFA Nations League C Group 3

2022–23 UEFA Nations League fixtures and results

Friendlies

UEFA competitions

UEFA Champions League

First qualifying round

|}

Second qualifying round

|}

UEFA Europa League

Third qualifying round

|}

Play-off round

|}

UEFA Europa Conference League

First qualifying round

|}

Second qualifying round

|}

Third qualifying round

|}

Play-off round

|}

Group stage

Group F

Notes

Men's football

Fortuna liga

Regular stage

Championship group

Relegation group

2. liga

Cup Competitions

Slovak Cup

Final

See also
List of Slovak football transfers summer 2021
List of Slovak football transfers winter 2021–22
List of foreign Slovak First League players

References

External links
 Slovak Football Association
 UEFA
 futbalnet.sk

 
 
 
National Team
2021 sport-related lists
2022 sport-related lists